Chum Het is a town (thesaban mueang) in Thailand, about 413 km north-east of Bangkok. The town covers the whole tambon Chum Het of Mueang Buriram district. As of 2012, it has a population of 20,418.

See also

 Buriram
 Buriram Province
 Amphoe Mueang Buriram

References

External links
Official Website

Populated places in Buriram province